The R537 is a Regional Route in South Africa.

Route
Its northern terminus is the R536 just east of Sabie, Mpumalanga. It runs south-east, ending at an intersection with the R40 near White River.

References

Regional Routes in Mpumalanga